Muddy Brook may refer to:

 A brook in Maberly, Newfoundland and Labrador, Canada
 A brook spanned by Bridge No. 1604 in Devil's Hopyard State Park in East Haddam, Connecticut, U.S.
 A tributary of Sandy River in Phillips, Maine, U.S.
 Sárospatak (Muddy Brook), a town in Borsod-Abaúj-Zemplén county, Hungary